Tarit Baran Topdar (born 5 March 1941) is an Indian politician, belonging to the Communist Party of India (Marxist) (CPI(M)). He was a Lok Sabha member 1989–2009, representing the Barrackpore constituency of West Bengal. He was defeated by Dinesh Trivedi by a margin of 56061 votes in the 15th Lok Sabha Election.

References

External links
 http://164.100.47.194/loksabha/members/memberbioprofile.aspx?mpsno=491&lastls=14

Living people
1941 births
Communist Party of India (Marxist) politicians from West Bengal
People from North 24 Parganas district
India MPs 2004–2009
India MPs 1999–2004
India MPs 1998–1999
India MPs 1996–1997
India MPs 1991–1996
India MPs 1989–1991
Vidyasagar College alumni
University of Calcutta alumni
Lok Sabha members from West Bengal
People from Mymensingh District